Prodoxoides asymmetra is a moth of the family Prodoxidae. It is found in the Valdivian temperate rain forest and humid Nothofagus-Chusqua forest along the border of Chile (Osorno Province) and Argentina (Río Negro Province). It is the only known Prodoxidae species in the Southern Hemisphere.

The wingspan is 9–13 mm. The forewings have different shades of pale to medium brown with a golden lustre.

The larvae probably feed on Myrceugenella apicaulata. It is thought the larvae bore inside the buds or twigs of their host plant.

References

Prodoxidae
Monotypic moth genera
Adeloidea genera
Moths of South America
Fauna of the Valdivian temperate rainforest